The Church of All Saints in Sutton Bingham in the civil parish of Closworth, Somerset, England, dates from the 12th and 13th centuries and has been designated as a Grade I listed building.

The interior includes a series of 14th century wall paintings, including, in the Chancel, the Coronation of the Virgin, and several bishops and saints. On the north wall of the nave is a portrayal of the Death of the Virgin (pictured below right). The murals were whitewashed during the Reformation and remained obscured until they were rediscovered in the 1860s.

The small belfry contains two bells, one dates from around 1250 and the other is from 1685.

The church is close to the shore of Sutton Bingham Reservoir.

Parish status

The church is in a joint parish with
St Mary's Church, East Chinnock
St Michael and All Angels' Church, East Coker
St Mary's Church, Hardington Mandeville
St Roch's Church, Pendomer
All Saints' Church, Closworth
St Martin of Tours' Church, West Coker

See also

 List of Grade I listed buildings in South Somerset
 List of towers in Somerset
 List of ecclesiastical parishes in the Diocese of Bath and Wells

References

External links

13th-century church buildings in England
Church of England church buildings in South Somerset
Grade I listed churches in Somerset
Grade I listed buildings in South Somerset